John Garo (born 29 January 1952 in Buma Village, Malaita Province; died 2007) was a Solomon Islands politician.

He was elected to the National Parliament as MP for West Kwaio in the December 2001 general election. In May 2003, he was elected Leader of the Official Opposition. He was, at the time, an independent MP. Two months later, as Leader of the Opposition, he supported Prime Minister Allan Kemakeza's motion requesting that an Australian-led international peacekeeping force be deployed in Solomon Islands, in the wake of armed ethnic conflict on Guadalcanal. This led to the Regional Assistance Mission to Solomon Islands (RAMSI). In July 2004, he benefited from a Cabinet reshuffle, leaving the Opposition and joining the government as Minister of State assisting the Prime Minister.

He was not re-elected to Parliament in 2006, and died the following year.

References

1952 births
2007 deaths
Members of the National Parliament of the Solomon Islands
People from Malaita Province
Leaders of the Opposition (Solomon Islands)